Vitaly Dmitrievich Shafranov (December 1, 1929 – June 9, 2014) was a Russian theoretical physicist and Academician who worked with plasma physics and thermonuclear fusion research.

Life
Vitaly Dmitrievich Shafranov was born  in the village of Mordvinovo in Ryazan region in 1929. During World War II, Schafranov attended the school and worked together with his father building roads. In 1943 he got his first national award at the age 14. From 1946, Schafranov studied at the Physics Department of the Moscow State University. After graduating in 1951, he started to work with nuclear fusion in the Theory Department headed by Mikhail Aleksandrovich Leontovich at LIPAN (Laboratory of Measuring Instruments of the USSR Academy of Sciences) as today's Russian Research Centre "Kurchatov Institute" was known at the time. He examined tokamaks stability and gave some parameter estimation for Soviet tokamak experiments. He also dealt with shock waves in plasmas and interaction of electromagnetic waves with plasmas. Later, he worked intensively on stellarators. In 1981 he became the successor of Leontovich as head of the Theory Department of Nuclear Fusion at the Kurchatov Institute.

Concepts such as the Shafranov shift (1959), the Kruskal-Shafranov stability criterion and limit value and the Grad-Shafranov equation (1957) are named after him. In 1972, he suggested with Lev Artsimovich a tokamak with D-shaped cross-section.

In 2001 he received the Hannes Alfvén Prize. In 1981 he became a corresponding member of the Soviet Academy of Sciences and full member of the Academy in 1997. In 1971 he was awarded the State Prize of the USSR and the Lenin Prize in 1984.

Since 1983 he was editor of Plasma Physics Reports (Fizika Plasmy). From the death of Boris Kadomtsev to his death, he served as the editor of the Reviews of Plasma Physics collection.

Selected work
 On magnetohydrodynamical equilibrium configurations, Soviet Physics JETP, vol. 6, 1983, p. 1013.
 Plasma Equilibrium in a Magnetic Field, in  Leontovich, M. A. (Ed.): Reviews of Plasma Physics, vol. 2, 1963.
 Electromagnetic waves in a plasma, in Leontovich: Reviews of Plasma Physics, vol. 3, 1963.
 V. S. Mukhovatov: Plasma equilibrium in a Tokamak, Nuclear Fusion, vol. 11, 1971, p. 605.
 L E Zakharov, V D Shafranov. Equilibrium of a toroidal plasma with noncircular cross-section, Sov. Phys. Tech. Phys. vol. 18, 1973, 151–156.
 L. E. Zakharov, V. D. Shafranov. Evolution of equilibrium of toroidal plasma, in B. Kadomtsev, Plasma Physics, Advances in Science and Technology in the USSR Physics Series, MIR Moscow 1981.
 L. E. Zakharov, V. D. Shafranov. Equilibrium of current carrying plasmas in toroidal configurations, in M. A. Leontovich Reviews of Plasma Physics, vol. 11, Consultants Bureau, New York 1986.
  V. D. Shafranov. Magnetohydrodynamic theory of plasma equilibrium and stability in stellarators: a survey of results, Physics of Fluids, vol. 26, 1983, S. 357.
 V. D. Pustovitov in B. Kadomtsev: Reviews of Plasma Physics, vol. 15, 1989, 163.

References

External links 
 Award of the 2001 Hannes Alfvén Prize of the European Physical Society to Professor Vitaly Shafranov
 Vitalii Dmitrievich Shafranov (on his 80th birthday)

1929 births
2014 deaths
Soviet physicists
20th-century Russian physicists
Lenin Prize winners
Full Members of the USSR Academy of Sciences
Plasma physicists